The visa policy of the United Kingdom is the policy by which His Majesty's Government determines visa requirements for visitors to the United Kingdom, and the Crown dependencies of Guernsey, Jersey, and the Isle of Man and those seeking to work, study or reside there. All intended entrants must obtain a visa unless they are exempt.

The UK operates its own visa policy and maintains the Common Travel Area with the Republic of Ireland, the Channel Islands and the Isle of Man. British Overseas Territories generally apply their own similar but legally distinct visa policies.

The United Kingdom was a member of the European Union until 31 January 2020, and EU/EEA/Swiss citizens enjoyed freedom of movement to the UK until the transition period ended on 31 December 2020.

Visa policy map

The following persons can enter the United Kingdom, the Channel Islands and the Isle of Man without a visa:

As of right
 British nationals:
British citizens
British subjects with the right of abode in the United Kingdom
 Irish citizens

Non-visa nationals
Nationals of the following countries and territories are visa-exempt for credibility-assessed stays in the UK of no longer than 6 months (or 1 month for permitted paid engagements):

Non-visa nationals greeted by UK immigration officers arriving from outside the Common Travel Area are credibility-assessed as to grant of entry: "leave to enter". If granted for a regular visit they, excluding seven nations, receive a passport stamp in their passport at the UK Border Force entry checkpoint stating 'Leave to enter for six months: employment and recourse to public funds prohibited'. The exception covers nationals who are admitted, or admissible, by the ePassport gates system. These generally do not receive a passport stamp. 
Those who entered using the Iris Recognition Immigration System (which was in operation from 2004 to 2013) did not receive a passport stamp.

Since 20 May 2019, Australian, Canadian, Japanese, New Zealand, Singaporean, South Korean and United States citizens seeking the above, most common, form of entry generally receive no passport stamp, regardless of whether they use an ePassport gate or a staffed control desk. Three categories of their applicants for entry must go to a staffed control desk, for their passport will receive the relevant stamp(s): on a permitted paid engagement; or with a Tier 5 (Temporary Worker - Creative and Sporting) Certificate of Sponsorship (for up to 3 months);

Instead of endorsing a passport stamp, UK Border Force officers are permitted to grant leave to enter by fax or e-mail. They may also grant this orally (including by telephone) to a non-visa national seeking to stay as a visitor for up to 6 months. They, in general, have no power to do so where it has been conferred by another Common Travel Area border official.

In the case of certain general aviation flights travellers may sometimes not be inspected by the UK Border Force on arrival (depending on the risk assessment per the travellers' information submitted in advance via the General Aviation Report (GAR) form) and may be 'remotely cleared' instead. In this case, although leave to enter is granted by implication or process, no passport stamp is received.

All people arriving in the UK directly from the Republic of Ireland (part of the Common Travel Area) are not subject to routine checks by the UK Border Force on arrival in the UK. By virtue of the Immigration (Control of Entry through Republic of Ireland) Order 1972, non-visa nationals are automatically deemed to receive leave to remain in the UK for 6 months (also known as 'deemed leave'). They are forbidden from gainful employment during this period. In this situation, no passport stamp is received upon entry to the UK.

Similarly, all persons travelling between the UK and the Channel Islands and the Isle of Man (parts of the Common Travel Area) are not subject to routine immigration checks and no passport stamps are endorsed (although customs checks are sometimes carried out on passengers travelling between the UK and the Channel Islands, as they are separate customs areas). By virtue of Schedule 4 to the Immigration Act 1971, any leave to enter that is granted by the Crown Dependencies has effect as if the leave to enter had been given by the UK (and vice versa) under the same conditions and for the same period of time.

All travellers arriving in the Crown Dependencies (the Channel Islands and the Isle of Man) directly from the Republic of Ireland (i.e. from within the Common Travel Area) are not subject to routine immigration checks and do not receive a passport stamp on arrival. Non-visa nationals are automatically deemed to receive leave to enter for 6 months and are not permitted to engage in gainful employment during this period.

Electronic visa waiver (EVW)
Nationals of the following countries may obtain an electronic visa waiver (EVW) instead of a visa:

British–Irish Visa Scheme (BIVS)
Nationals of the following countries can travel to the UK without a visa if they hold a valid Irish visa endorsed with BIVS:

Ukraine schemes
 – Nationals of Ukraine (and their family members of any nationality) who have a family member or sponsor in the UK may apply online for permission to enter and remain in the UK. If approved, they may travel to the UK with such permission letter instead of a visa.

Non-ordinary passport holders
Holders of diplomatic or special passports of the following countries do not require a visa:

Visa waiver also applies to holders of  United Nations laissez-passer when they travel to the United Kingdom on official business.

Transit

There are two types of transit through the United Kingdom under the United Kingdom Transit Rules — airside transit and landside transit. The Transit Without Visa facility for visa requiring nationals was abolished, effective 1 December 2014, and replaced with United Kingdom Transit Rules. Notwithstanding the lists below, in general, even persons from 'Direct Airside transit visa-exempt nationalities' require a transit visa if transiting though the UK to other parts of the Common Travel Area including Ireland.

Airside transit
Available only at London Heathrow Airport.
Available only to passengers arriving and departing by air to an international destination other than Ireland on the same day.
Available only to passengers not leaving the airside zone of the airport and not passing through immigration control.
Concerns passengers who would normally require a visitor visa to enter the United Kingdom but who hold a Direct Airside Transit visa, a passport of an airside transit visa-exempt country, or an airside transit visa exemption document.

Landside transit
Available only to passengers arriving and departing by air by 23:59 the next day who require passing through immigration control and leaving the airport building only for transit purposes.
Concerns passengers who would normally require a visitor visa to enter the United Kingdom but who hold a Visitor in Transit visa or a landside visa exemption document.

Airside transit visa-exempt nationalities

Airside transit visa exemption documents
The exemption applies where travellers:

 arrive and depart by air, and
 the onward flight must be confirmed, and must depart the same day, and
 have proper documentation for their destination (including a visa for the destination country if necessary), and
 fulfil any one of the below conditions:

 have a valid visa for Australia, Canada, New Zealand or the US, whether or not travelling to or from those countries, or
 have a valid Australian or New Zealand residence visa; or
 have a valid Canadian permanent resident card issued on or after 28 June 2002; or
 have a valid uniform format residence permit issued by an EEA state under Council Regulation (EC) number 1030/2002; or
 have a valid Irish biometric visa endorsed BC or BC BIVS; or
 have a valid uniform format category D visa for entry to a state in the European Economic Area (EEA); or
 have a valid US I-551 permanent resident card issued on or after 21 April 1998; or
 have an expired I-551 permanent resident card issued on or after 21 April 1998, accompanied by an I-797 extension letter; or
 have a standalone US Immigration Form 155A/155B attached to an envelope; or
 have a valid Schengen Approved destination Scheme (ADS) group tourism visa where the holder is travelling to the country that issued it or holds a valid airline ticket from the Schengen area, provided the holder can demonstrate they entered there no more than 30 days previously on the basis of a valid Schengen ADS visa;

E-visas or e-residence permits are not acceptable for airside transit unless the airline is able to verify it with the issuing country. Nationals of Syria who are holders of US B1/B2 visas are not exempt.

Visitor in Transit visa exemption documents
The exemption applies where travellers:

 arrive and depart by air, and
 the onward flight must be confirmed, and must depart by 23:59 the following day, and
 have proper documentation for their destination (including a visa for the destination country if necessary), and
 fulfil any one of the below conditions:

 have a valid entry visa for Australia, Canada, New Zealand or the US, and a valid airline ticket for travel via the UK, as part of a reasonable journey to or from one of those countries, or
 have a valid airline ticket for travel via the UK as part of a reasonable journey from Australia, Canada, New Zealand or the US, if they are transiting the UK no more than 6 months after the date when they last entered Australia, Canada, New Zealand or the US with a valid entry visa for that country; or
 have a valid Australian or New Zealand residence visa; or
 have a valid Canadian permanent resident card issued on or after 28 June 2002; or
 have a valid uniform format residence permit issued by an EEA state under Council Regulation (EC) number 1030/2002; or
 have a valid Irish biometric visa endorsed BC or BC BIVS; or
 have a valid uniform format category D visa for entry to a state in the European Economic Area (EEA); or
 have a valid US I-551 permanent resident card issued on or after 21 April 1998; or
 have an expired I-551 permanent resident card issued on or after 21 April 1998, accompanied by an I-797 extension letter; or
 have a standalone US Immigration Form 155A/155B attached to an envelope;

E-visas such as those regularly issued by Australia or e-residence permits are not acceptable for landside transit.

Obtaining an entry visa

Visitors entering the UK, the Channel Islands and/or the Isle of Man who do not qualify for one of the visa exemptions listed above have to apply for a visa in advance through the UK Visas and Immigration at a visa application centre.

All visitors must apply by registering an online account (except citizens of North Korea who must apply in person at the British Embassy), fill in the application form, pay the fee and attend an appointment at a visa application centre.

A visitor's visa for a single stay or multiple stays of up to 6 months costs £95. A multiple-entry visitor's visa valid for 2 years costs £361, 5 years £655, and 10 years £822. Chinese citizens in can, for certain common forms of travel, obtain a 2-year, multiple-entry visitor's visa at a cost of £95.

Family members of EU, EEA and Swiss citizens who are not covered by one of the visa exemptions above can apply for an EEA Family Permit free of charge (instead of a visa).

Visitors applying for most types of UK visas (including a visitor's visa and an EEA Family Permit) are required to submit biometric identifiers (all fingerprints and a digital facial image) as part of the visa application process. However, diplomats, foreign government ministers and officials and members of Commonwealth Forces are exempt from the requirement to submit biometric identifiers. Applicants who have obtained a new passport and are merely requesting a transfer of their visa vignette from their old passport to their new passport are not required to re-submit biometric identifiers. In addition, applicants who are travelling directly to the Channel Islands or Gibraltar without passing through the UK or the Isle of Man are exempt from providing biometric information. Children must be accompanied by an adult when their biometric identifiers are taken. Biometric identifiers may be shared with foreign governments. Biometric identifiers are destroyed 10 years after the last date a person's fingerprints and digital facial image were captured.

Most visa applications are decided within 3 weeks.

Applicants resident in the following countries and territories who wish to enter the UK for 6 months or more are required to be tested for tuberculosis as part of the visa application process:

After a person has successfully obtained a UK visa, if they subsequently obtain a new passport, but the UK visa in their old passport still has remaining validity, they are not required to have the UK visa vignette affixed in the old passport transferred to the new passport, but must be able to present both the new and old passports at passport control when entering the UK.

If a person who has successfully obtained a UK visa subsequently loses the passport in which the visa vignette is affixed (or if it is stolen), they have to pay the original visa fee in full again and may be required to show that their circumstances have not changed when applying for a replacement visa. However, a new 'confirmation of acceptance for studies' (CAS)/'certificate of sponsorship' (COS) is not required when applying for a replacement Tier 4/Tier 2 visa.

Visa types 
These are correct as of April 2015.

Visitor visas
Standard Visitor visa
Marriage Visitor visa
Permitted Paid Engagement visa
Parent of a Tier 4 child visa
Visa to pass through the UK in transit
Direct Airside Transit visa
Visitor in Transit visa

Work visas 
As of September 2022:
 Skilled Worker visa
 Health and Care Worker visa
 Senior or Specialist Worker visa (Global Business Mobility)
 Scale-up Worker visa
 Minister of Religion visa (T2)
 International Sportsperson visa

 Charity Worker visa (Temporary Work)
 Creative Worker visa (Temporary Work)
 Government Authorised Exchange visa (Temporary Work)
 International Agreement visa (Temporary Work)
 Religious Worker visa (Temporary Work)
 Seasonal Worker visa (Temporary Work)
 Youth Mobility Scheme visa
 Graduate visa
 High Potential Individual (HPI) visa
 Graduate Trainee visa (Global Business Mobility)
 UK Expansion Worker visa (Global Business Mobility)
 Secondment Worker visa (Global Business Mobility)
 Service Supplier visa (Global Business Mobility)

 Innovator visa
 Start-up visa
 Global Talent visa
 Entrepreneur visa (Tier 1)
 Investor visa (Tier 1)

 UK Ancestry visa
 Exempt vignette
 Frontier Worker permit
 British National (Overseas) visa
 Overseas Domestic Worker visa
 Representative of an Overseas Business visa
 Turkish Businessperson visa
 Turkish Worker visa
 Service providers from Switzerland visa

Student visas
Short-term study visa
Tier 4 visa
General
Child

History
 
By early 1917, all aliens (i.e. persons who were not British subjects) were required to obtain visas from a British consul before embarking for the United Kingdom. Visa requirements would then be maintained for aliens under the peacetime regime of immigration control retained after 1918.

Visas were mutually abolished between the UK and France in July 1921, although this did not apply to French overseas territories or the rest of the British Empire.

Post-World War II
Members of the British Empire had been considered British subjects before the war and did not generally need visas; this did not apply to mandated territories such as South West Africa or Western Samoa, whose residents did need visas but were eligible to stay indefinitely. As dominions became more independent and adopted their own nationality laws, however, visa restrictions started to be applied.

The abolition of visa requirements was increased in post-war era as part of a policy to make travel freer and easier; by 1949 visa requirements had been abolished in 20 countries.

Although waiving visas or visa charges for United States citizens was discussed as early as 1930, such visas would remain until 1948, when the UK abolished such visas and the US waived visa fees and doubled visa lengths for UK citizens, albeit stopping short at full visa abolition due to domestic considerations; MP Phil Piratin was denied a visa.

Modern history
In March 2007, the Home Office announced that it would carry out its first Visa Waiver Test to review the list of countries and territories outside the European Union, European Economic Area and Switzerland whose nationals are exempt from holding a visa for the UK.

After carrying out the review, in July 2008, Jacqui Smith, the Home Secretary, and David Miliband, the Foreign Secretary, announced to Parliament that the results of the test showed a 'strong case' for introducing visa regimes for 11 countries (Bolivia, Botswana, Brazil, Lesotho, Malaysia, Mauritius, Namibia, South Africa, Swaziland, Trinidad and Tobago and Venezuela) having taken into account the following factors (including the extent to which they were being addressed by the countries' authorities):
 Passport security and integrity
 The degree of co-operation over deportation or removal of the countries' nationals from the UK
 Levels of illegal working in the UK and other immigration abuse (such as fraudulent asylum claims)
 Levels of crime and terrorism risk posed to the UK

Following the July 2008 announcement, the UK Government entered into a 6-month period of 'detailed dialogue' with the governments of the 11 countries 'to examine how risks can be reduced in a way that obviates the need for a visa regime to be introduced'. In order to maintain visa-free access to the UK, the 11 countries had to 'demonstrate a genuine commitment to put into effect credible and realistic plans, with clear timetables, to reduce the risks to the UK, and begin real implementation of these plans by the end of
the dialogue period'.

On 9 January 2009, the new visa rules announced required citizens of Bolivia, Lesotho, South Africa and Swaziland to obtain a visa, and only Venezuelan nationals travelling on biometric passports with an electronic chip issued since 2007 could continue to enter the UK without a visa. The existing visa-free status for citizens of Botswana, Brazil, Malaysia, Mauritius, Namibia and Trinidad and Tobago was maintained.

Starting from 3 March 2009, a transitional regime was put in place until 30 June 2009 for South African citizens - those who held a valid South African passport and had previously entered the UK lawfully using that passport could continue to enter the UK without a visa, whilst all other South African citizens were required to apply for a visa. On the same day, Taiwan citizens were able to enter the UK without a visa. On 18 May 2009, Bolivian citizens were no longer able to enter the UK without a visa and Venezuelan citizens were required to present a biometric passport to enter the UK without a visa. On 1 July 2009, all South African citizens were required to apply for a visa to enter the UK. On the same day, citizens of Lesotho and Swaziland were required to apply for a visa to enter the UK.

On 30 March 2010, Alan Johnson, the Home Secretary, and David Miliband, the Foreign Secretary, announced to Parliament that, having carried out a review of visa regimes in relation to Eastern Caribbean countries, 5 countries (Antigua and Barbuda, Barbados, Grenada, St Kitts and Nevis and St Vincent and the Grenadines) would have their visa-free status maintained. At the same time, the UK Government would enter a six-month period of 'detailed dialogue' with the governments of 2 countries (Dominica and St Lucia), who would have to 'demonstrate a genuine commitment to put into effect credible and realistic plans, with clear timetables, to reduce the risks to the UK, and begin implementing these plans by the end of the dialogue period' to maintain their visa-free status. On 2 March 2011, Theresa May, the Home Secretary, and William Hague, the Foreign Secretary, announced to Parliament that the governments of Dominica and St Lucia 'have made concrete improvements to the immigration, border control and identity systems which would not have happened without the test', and so the visa-free status for the 2 countries would be maintained.

On 13 June 2011, new Immigration Rules were laid before Parliament that came into force on 4 July 2011 introducing a new streamlined application procedure (waiving the normal requirements to provide documentary evidence of maintenance and qualifications at the time of application) for some non-visa nationals from 'low-risk countries' who wish to study in the UK for more than 6 months and apply for Tier 4 entry clearance. The following 15 countries and territories were categorised as 'low-risk' and included in 'Appendix H' of the Immigration Rules: Argentina, Australia, Brunei, Canada, Chile, Croatia, Hong Kong, Japan, New Zealand, Singapore, South Korea, Taiwan, Trinidad and Tobago and the United States. Although the announcement did not relate to a Visa Waiver Test per se, it showed that the UK Border Agency considers some countries and territories in the list of visa-free nationalities to be lower risk than others. In particular, Trinidad and Tobago, which was considered to be a high-risk country from a visa regime perspective in 2008 when the Visa Waiver Test was carried out, was now viewed by the UK Border Agency as a low-risk country. On 5 September 2012, two more countries (Botswana and Malaysia) were added to the list of 'low-risk' nationalities for the purpose of Tier 4 entry clearance applications, i.e. 'Appendix H', (taking effect on 1 October 2012), whilst on 6 September 2013, Barbados was also added to 'Appendix H' (taking effect on 1 October 2013). Again, although the announcement did not relate to a Visa Waiver Test per se, it showed that Botswana, Malaysia and Barbados (countries which were considered to be a high-risk countries from a visa regime perspective when the Visa Waiver Test was carried out in 2008 in the case of Botswana and Malaysia, and in 2010 in the case of Barbados) were now viewed by the UK Border Agency as low-risk countries.

In March 2013, it was revealed that Theresa May, the Home Secretary, was considering removing Brazil from the list of visa-exempt nationalities due to concerns about illegal immigration, since Brazil was fifth in the top 10 of illegal immigrant nationalities in the UK according to Home Office figures for 2011, and was the only country on the list for which short-term visitors do not need a visa. However, the UK Government later decided to retain the visa exemption for Brazilian citizens, a decision which was seen as attempting to develop closer trading links with Brazil.

On 1 January 2014, an electronic visa waiver (EVW) scheme was introduced, enabling citizens of Oman, Qatar and the United Arab Emirates who have obtained an EVW authorisation online to visit and/or study in the UK for up to 6 months without a visa; with Kuwait added to the EVW scheme during February 2016.

After 'assessing countries against a list of risk and compliance criteria', the UK Government added Kuwait, Oman, Qatar and the UAE to 'Appendix H' (the list of 'low-risk' nationalities for the purpose of Tier 4 student visa applications) at various periods between 2014 and 2018 but according to the Cambridge Education Group, Oman was to be removed from this Appendix. However, it doesn't seem like this may have occurred.

These two changes reflect the UK Government's view that Kuwait, Oman, Qatar and the UAE should now be regarded as low-risk countries from a visa regime perspective and it is possible that, in future, nationals of these four countries will be classified as non-visa nationals (enabling them to visit and/or study in the UK without a visa for up to 6 months without having to obtain an EVW authorisation online every time they wish to enter the UK).

On 13 March 2014, the UK Government announced that, with effect from 5 May 2014, Venezuelan citizens (including those with biometric passports) would require a visa to enter the UK.

In January 2020, British ambassador to Ukraine announced that there would be no visa-free arrangements for Ukrainian citizens.

On April 9, 2020, the Home Office issued a new immigration rule imposing visa restriction on low-skilled people workers with effect from January 2021. The restriction introduced a new point-based immigration system, allotting points for certain skills, salaries, qualification and shortage occupations. Any worker with points falling below the given threshold will be restricted from applying for UK work visa, as per the new immigration rule. Free Movement, a UK-based website updating, commenting, training and advising on immigration and asylum laws, claims that nurses, hospital porters, cleaners, postal workers, etc., are to be worst affected by the new immigration law.

In February 2021, the UK's new visa scheme stated that Hong Kong residents with a British National (Overseas) passport can stay in the UK for five years and get full citizenship.

In May 2022, a new visa scheme was offered to graduates from the world's top 50 universities, giving them a two year long work visa with the opportunity to prolong it if they meet certain requirements.

From 4 August 2022, police registration is no longer required.

Reciprocity

Of the 87 countries and territories whose citizens are granted 6 months' visa-free access to the UK:

15 reciprocate to British citizens: Andorra, Antigua and Barbuda, Bahamas, Barbados, Canada, Dominica, Grenada, Hong Kong, Macao, Mexico, Monaco, New Zealand, Panama, San Marino and Vatican City.
The New Zealand process entails a New Zealand Electronic Travel Authority (NZeTA) (at a cost of NZD 9 or NZD 12) ahead of travel.
50 grant their standard visitor entry for up to 90 days (or 3 months), where granted: Argentina, Australia, Austria, Belgium, Brazil, Brunei, Bulgaria, Chile, Colombia, Costa Rica, Croatia, Cyprus, Czech Republic, Denmark, Estonia, Finland, France, Germany, Greece, Guyana, Honduras, Hungary, Iceland, Israel, Italy, Latvia, Liechtenstein, Lithuania, Luxembourg, Malaysia, Malta, Namibia, Netherlands, Nicaragua, Norway, Paraguay, Peru, Poland, Portugal, Romania, Saint Kitts and Nevis, Singapore, Slovakia, Slovenia, Solomon Islands, South Korea, Spain, Sweden, Switzerland, Trinidad and Tobago, United States and Uruguay. 
The United States process entails an ESTA (at a cost of US$14) in advance if entering the US by air or by sea.
Australia requires British citizens to obtain an eVisitor authorisation online in advance free of charge
14 grant their standard visitor entry for times mentioned: Belize (1 month), Kiribati (30 days), Maldives (30 days), Marshall Islands (30 days), Mauritius (60 days for tourists, 90 days on business), Micronesia (30 days), Nauru (30 days), Palau (30 days), St Lucia (6 weeks), Samoa (60 days), Seychelles (1 month, extendable to 12 months), Tonga (31 days), Tuvalu (1 month), Vanuatu (30 days)
3 grant their standard visitor entry for up to 90 days (or 3 months), but extendable, with express permission: Botswana, Japan and Taiwan.

Beyond reciprocity (recent legacy arrangements)
Three South American legacy arrangements remain, and one recent other, as at 2020: (standard visitor grants of entry obtainable to, for duration stated)
Bolivia (90 days), Ecuador (90 days) and Venezuela (90 days).
Fiji (4 months, extendable for an extra 2 months).

No reciprocity
Papua New Guinea requires British citizens to apply for a visa on arrival, valid for up to 60 days, for PGK100 (tourist) or PGK500 (business)
Timor-Leste requires British citizens to apply for a visa on arrival valid for up to 30 days, for US$30.

Visitor statistics 
Most visitors arriving to United Kingdom were from the following countries of nationality. Note the statistics for Ireland are fluid; no visitor conditions attach and visits across the land border are not counted.

See also

 Visa policies of British Overseas Territories
 Common Travel Area
 Visa requirements for British citizens
 UK Electronic Travel Authorisation

Notes

References

 
UK